Jodhaiya Bai Baiga (born ) is an Indian fine artist. She is Baiga and lives in Lorha village, in Umaria district, Madhya Pradesh. She has two sons and a daughter. She used to earn money by selling compost, firewood and nuts from the forest.

When she was in her forties, her husband died and she started to paint. Her artistic style has been compared to Jangarh Singh Shyam, who was Gond. After painting on canvas and paper, she now also uses other media such as clay, metal and wood; her grandson makes masks which she paints. She is inspired by local Baiga motifs such as the mahua tree. Her paintings have been exhibited in Bhopal, Delhi, Milan and Paris. In 2022, she received the Nari Shakti Puraskar in recognition of her achievements. Subsequently, she was awarded the Padma Shri in Arts by the Government of India in 2023.

References

1930 births
Living people
People from Madhya Pradesh
Recipients of the Padma Shri in arts